The 1975 Honduran Segunda División was the ninth season of the Honduran Segunda División.  Under the management of Alfonso Uclés, Campamento won the tournament after defeating C.D. Lenca in the final series and obtained promotion to the 1976–77 Honduran Liga Nacional.

Final

 Campamento 5–5 Lenca on aggregate. Campamento won on forfeit.

References

Segunda
1975